The Great Colonnade at Apamea was the main colonnaded avenue of the ancient city of Apamea in the Orontes River valley in northwestern Syria. It was built in the second century CE after Apamea's devastation in the 115 earthquake. The monumental colonnade is among the longest and most famous in the Roman world.

Overview
The original Hellenistic colonnade was devastated, along with the rest of Apamea, in the 115 earthquake. Reconstruction started immediately under the Romans, and over the course of the second century the city was completely rebuilt, starting with the Great Colonnade.

The colonnade was aligned along the north-south axis, making up the city's cardo maximus under the Romans. Starting at the city's north gate, the colonnade ran in an uninterrupted straight line for almost  to the south gate. The northern third of the colonnade's stretch is marked by a monumental votive column that stood opposite the baths. Two triple arches were built into the Great Colonnade as part of the intersection. The colonnade passed through the center of the city and several important buildings were clustered around it, including the baths, the agora, the Temple of Tyche, the nymphaeum, the rotunda, the atrium church and the basilica.

The columns display two main designs: a plain one, and the distinctive spiral-flutes. Archaeologist Jean Lassus argues that the former dates back to the Trajanic period, while the latter to that of Antoninus Pius. The colonnade's porticoes were paved with extensive mosaics along the full stretch of the colonnade.

Under the Byzantine Emperor, Justinian I, several parts of the colonnade were restored. Several stretches of the street had their Roman pavement replaced with a new pavement made of squared blocks of limestone. The new pavement also covered a completely overhauled drainage system. The city, was however, later sacked by the Sasanians under Adarmahan.

Gallery

See also
Roman Theatre at Apamea
Great Colonnade at Palmyra

Sources

Notes

Bibliography

 

Apamea, Syria
Colonnades
Ancient Roman buildings and structures in Syria
Buildings and structures completed in the 2nd century
Streets in Syria